Howard is an unincorporated community located in Holmes County, Mississippi and is approximately  south of Tchula. The community was once a stop on the Yazoo and Mississippi Valley Railroad. Howard was incorporated in 1888 but lost that status at an unknown date. A post office operated under the name Howard from 1887 to 1920.

References

Unincorporated communities in Holmes County, Mississippi
Unincorporated communities in Mississippi